Cyana tripuncta is a moth of the family Erebidae. It was described by Hervé de Toulgoët in 1980. It is found on Grande Comore in the Comoros in the Indian Ocean.

References

Cyana
Moths described in 1980
Moths of the Comoros
Endemic fauna of the Comoros